Thomas Hart Ruffin (September 9, 1820 – October 17, 1863) was a Congressional Representative from North Carolina; born in Louisburg, North Carolina, September 9, 1820; attended the common schools; graduated from the University of North Carolina Law School, Chapel Hill, North Carolina, 1841; lawyer, private practice; circuit attorney of the seventh judicial district of the state of Missouri 1844–1848; elected as a Democrat to the Thirty-third and to the three succeeding Congresses (March 4, 1853 – March 3, 1861); delegate to the Confederate Provisional Congress at Richmond, Va., in July 1861; during the American Civil War served in the Confederate Army as colonel of the 1st North Carolina Cavalry Regiment, Confederate States of America; mortally wounded in action on October 14, 1863, at Auburn, Virginia; died October 17, 1863, in Grace Church Hospital, Alexandria, Virginia; interment in the private cemetery on the Ruffin homestead, near Louisburg, N.C.

See also 
 Thirty-third United States Congress
 Thirty-fourth United States Congress
 Thirty-fifth United States Congress
 Thirty-sixth United States Congress

External links 
 U.S. Congressional Biographical Directory

1820 births
1863 deaths
People from Louisburg, North Carolina
Confederate States Army officers
People of North Carolina in the American Civil War
Democratic Party members of the United States House of Representatives from North Carolina
Deputies and delegates to the Provisional Congress of the Confederate States
19th-century American politicians
United States politicians killed during the Civil War
Confederate States of America military personnel killed in the American Civil War
Ruffin family